Sea Train is a debut A&M Records album by the band Seatrain, recorded in 1969. The band was created from the former members of Blues Project.

Track listing 

 "Sea Train" (Kulberg, Roberts) 4:12
 "Let the Duchess No" (Gregory, Roberts) 3:42
 "Pudding Street" (Kulberg) 5:00
 "Portrait of the Lady as a Young Artist" (Gregory, Roberts) 3:46
 "As I Lay Losing" (Kulberg, Roberts) 5:00
 "Rondo" (Gregory, Roberts) 3:29
 "Sweet's Creek's Suite" (Kulberg) 3:56
 "Outwear the Hills" (Kulberg, Roberts) 5:15

Personnel

 Richard Greene - violin, backing vocals, keyboards, viola
 Roy Blumenfeld - drums, percussion
 John Gregory - guitar, lead vocals
 Don Kretmar - saxophone, bass
 Andy Kulberg - bass, backing vocals, flute
 Jim Roberts - lyrics, backing vocals

References

1969 debut albums
Seatrain (band) albums
A&M Records albums